Melanie Joy Fontana (born October 3, 1986) is an American singer, composer and songwriter signed to Universal Music Group.

Early life
Fontana was born in Newington, Connecticut. She moved to New York City when she was 18, after spending seven years commuting to Manhattan, where she would audition for singing roles and work as a demo singer, recording songs for writers to pitch to record companies.

Career
Fontana co-wrote the 2011 Justin Bieber song "Home This Christmas" with Nasri Atweh. It was featured on Bieber's Christmas album Under the Mistletoe. Also in 2011, Fontana co-wrote the original theme song to Shelter Me, a PBS show, hosted by Katherine Heigl that celebrated the human-animal bond. The series focuses on shelter animal success stories. The theme song, "Love is Everything (Shelter Me)," was written by Austin Bis, Fontana and Daniel Walker, and performed by Fontana. In 2014, she co-wrote the song "Hit Me Up" with Lars Hustoft and Jon Asher for Eurovision Song Contest competitor Charlie Tepstad of Norway.

On April 5, 2013, the song "Nothing Really Matters" by tyDi, which Fontana was featured on and was co-written by STIX of Fly Panda, debuted on Billboard. It reached number 39 on the Billboard Dance Club Songs chart in 2013. Also in 2013, Fontana worked as a songwriting consultant on Norway's Idol television show, co-writing Astrid S's single "Shattered", which went Gold in Scandinavia. In 2015, Fontana, alongside tyDi, topped the Mediabase dance charts at Number 1 with their EDM track "Redefined", co-written by Priya J. Geddis. The song was Sirius XM's top song of 2015 on its BPM station. She also collaborated with tyDi and Col3man on the 2017 single "That's How You Know".

In 2016, Britney Spears released the Japanese edition of her album Glory, including a song written by Fontana with Jon Asher and produced by DJ Mustard, titled "Mood Ring". Fontana had three Top 10 singles stemming from the Korean Mnet TV show Produce 101: "Crush", "Yum Yum" and "Fingertips". On April 1, 2016, Aaron Carter released "Fools Gold" which was co-written by Fontana, Carter, Asher, Taylor Hegelson and Michel "Lindgren" Schulz. Fontana co-wrote all five tracks on Carter's 2017 comeback EP LøVë. On October 7, 2016, Daya released Sit Still, Look Pretty, which included two songs penned by Fontana, "Words" and "All Right". She co-wrote The Chainsmokers single "Setting Fires", released in November 2016, and the BTS single "Euphoria", released in April 2018, which reached number 2 on the Billboard World Digital Songs chart. She and her husband Michel "Lindgren" Schulz helped write the 2019 BTS single "Boy with Luv" featuring Halsey, which was the fastest YouTube video to reach 100 million views (doing it in under two days). Fontana is managed by Justin Garza.

Controversies

BTS songwriting controversy
An Instagram post made by Fontana in April 2019 regarding her co-writing credit in BTS's "Boy With Luv" drew criticism for its wording and its implication of her being the main writer of the song. Fontana later edited her original comments to better reflect her involvement. Fontana's emphasis on her songwriting credits in several other BTS songs, including "Euphoria", "Sweet Night", and "On", led to questioning regarding the involvement of her contributions to each song's lyrics throughout online media outlets. Universal Music Group's publishing division posted a photo of Fontana on their Instagram account highlighting her work on "Sweet Night", where she reportedly responded in the comments stating "Tsym for all the support, ME (love) YOU GUYS SO MUCH!!!".

Fontana expressed through Instagram Live the distress and hurtfulness received by the backlash as well as her stance on the situation. Fontana's spouse, Michel "Lindgren" Schulz, publicly defended Fontana on Twitter. He linked the backlash to online harassment and stated that "different cultures have different ways of talking about achievements". Schulz added by claiming that he and Fontana wrote "every single word in 'Sweet Night'" and was requested to "by the Big Hit label and V himself". His response also received similar criticism.

Alleged racism controversy 
Following backlash and criticism from fans of BTS regarding the above songwriting controversy, Fontana addressed multiple comments on her personal Instagram, stating that the authors of certain comments were racist, and asking fans in a now deleted comment: "what if I showed your racist remarks to the guys? Lol". Fans then began exposing old tweets from the songwriter, including one that read "I'd not last a second in starving Africa" and one which included a suicide threat to a stranger for scuffing her bumper. In light of the outrage from fans regarding her accusing them of being racist towards her and their subsequent claims that she believed in reverse racism, Fontana changed her profile picture to an icon designed in light of the BLM movement.

F(x) Sulli controversy 
A post made by the songwriter on her Instagram story following the passing of F(x) former member Sulli on October 13/14th, 2019 garnered some backlash from fans of the singer. In her Instagram statement, she expressed her condolences to the singer and linked the abuse the late singer received for her feminist actions to the backlash Fontana herself received from fans of BTS over her wording on social media posts. Fontana stated that the following thought crossed her mind: "...if I was slightly more depressed, or slightly less comfortable in my very lucky life, I might seriously consider ending things". Fans were outraged by the songwriter seemingly "making light of and trivializing" Sulli's death, accusing Fontana of using the singer's suicide to talk about herself, emphasizing the point that Fontana only referred twice to Sulli herself in the over 200-word-long statement.

Discography

As songwriter 
{| class="wikitable plainrowheaders" style="text-align:center;"
! Year !! Artist !! Album !! Song
|-
|2011
|Justin Bieber ft. The Band Perry
|Under the Mistletoe
|"Home This Christmas"
|-
|rowspan="5"|2013
|Astrid S
|
|"Shattered"
|-
|Sverre Eide
|
|"Chain Reaction"
|-
|Eirik Søfteland
|
|"Lust or Love"
|-
|Girls' Generation
|Girls & Peace
|"Stay Girls"
|-
|Becky
|Gyu
|"Gyu"
|-
|rowspan="8"|2014
|Steffen Jakobsen
|Six String Love Affair
|"Set in Stone"
|-
|Alex Marshall
|
|"Si Je Pars"
|-
|Charlie
|
|"Hit Me Up"
|-
|rowspan="1"|f(x)
|rowspan="1"|Red Light
|rowspan="1"|"Boom, Bang, Boom"
|-
|rowspan="1"|Koda Kumi
|rowspan="1"|Walk of My Life
|rowspan="1"|"Dance In The Rain"
|-
|rowspan="1"|Andreas Varady
|rowspan="1"|Andreas Varady
|rowspan="1"|"Don't Stop the Music"
|-
|rowspan="1"|Constant Flow ft. Immortal Technique
|
|rowspan="1"|"Moment Of Peace"
|-
|rowspan="1"|Thomas Newson & Otto Orlandi
|
|rowspan="1"|"Bells At Midnight"
|-
|rowspan="3"|2015
|rowspan="1"|Shawn Hook
|rowspan="1"|Analog Love
|rowspan="1"|"Relapse"
|-
|rowspan="1"|Edurne
|rowspan="1"|Adrenalina
|rowspan="1"|"One Shot"
|-
|rowspan="1"|Lace Up
|
|rowspan="1"|"Dripping Gold"
|-
|rowspan="15"|2016
|rowspan="1"|I.O.I
|rowspan="1"|Chrysalis
|rowspan="1"|"Crush"
|-
|rowspan="2"|Produce 101
|rowspan="2"|
|rowspan="1"|"Fingertips"
|-
|rowspan="1"|"Yum Yum"
|-
|rowspan="1"|AOA
|rowspan="1"|Runway
|rowspan="1"|"Cherry Pop"
|-
|rowspan="1"|Fiestar
|
|rowspan="1"|"Apple Pie"
|-
|rowspan="1"|Tiffany Hwang
|rowspan="1"|I Just Wanna Dance
|rowspan="1"|"Yellow Light"
|-
|rowspan="1"|Los 5
|rowspan="1"|Meet Los Five
|rowspan="1"|"Do For Love"
|-
|rowspan="1"|Britney Spears
|rowspan="1"|Glory
|rowspan="1"|"Mood Ring"
|-
|rowspan="1"|The Chainsmokers
|rowspan="1"|Collage
|rowspan="1"|"Setting Fires"
|-
|rowspan="2"|Daya
|rowspan="2"|Sit Still, Look Pretty
|rowspan="1"|"Words"
|-
|rowspan="1"|"All Right"
|-
|rowspan="1"|Hyolyn feat. Jay Park
|rowspan="1"|It's Me
|rowspan="1"|"One Step"
|-
|rowspan="1"|Hatty Keane
|
|rowspan="1"|"In Your Arms"
|-
| rowspan="2" |Sammi Sanchez
|
|rowspan="1"|"Girls Talk"
|-
|
|"Deeper"
|-
| rowspan="15" |2017
| rowspan="6" |Aaron Carter
| rowspan="6" |LøVë
| rowspan="1" |"Fool's Gold"
|-
|rowspan="1"|"Let Me Let You"
|-
|rowspan="1"|"Sooner of Later"
|-
|rowspan="1"|"Same Way"
|-
|rowspan="1"|"Dearly Departed"
|-
|rowspan="1"|"Don't Say Goodbye"
|-
|rowspan="2"|Minzy
|rowspan="2"|Minzy Work 01: Uno
|rowspan="1"|"Ni Na No"
|-
|rowspan="1"|"Superwoman"
|-
|rowspan="1"|RaNia
|rowspan="1"|Refresh 7th
|rowspan="1"|"Breathe Heavy"
|-
|rowspan="2"|Kayef
|rowspan="2"|
|rowspan="1"|"Paradies"
|-
|rowspan="1"|"Wir Sind Okay"
|-
|rowspan="1"|Fabian Mazur ft. Dia Frampton
|rowspan="1"|
|rowspan="1"|"Young Once"
|-
|rowspan="1"|Melody Day
|rowspan="1"|Kiss On the Lips
|rowspan="1"|"Kiss On the Lips"
|-
|rowspan="1"|R3hab ft. Krewella
|
|rowspan="1"|"Ain't That Why"
|-
|ILLENIUM ft. Dia Frampton
|Awake
|"Needed You"
|-
| rowspan="8" |2018
| rowspan="1" |Kayef
| rowspan="1" |
| rowspan="1" |"Irgendwann Jetzt"
|-
|rowspan="1"|BTS
|rowspan="1"|Love Yourself: Answer
|rowspan="1"|"Euphoria"
|-
|rowspan="1"|AOA
|rowspan="1"|Bingle Bangle
|rowspan="1"|"Parfait"
|-
|rowspan="1"|Topic ft. Juan Magan & Lena
|
|rowspan="1"|"Sólo Contigo"
|-
|Felix Sandman
|EMOTIONS
|"TONE IT DOWN"
|-
|rowspan="1"|Drake Bell
|rowspan="1"|
|rowspan="1"|"Fuego Lento"
|-
|rowspan="1"|Loren Gray
|rowspan="1"|
|rowspan="1"|"Kick You Out"
|-
|DeathbyRomy
|Monsters
|"No More"
|-
| rowspan="22" |2019
| rowspan="4" |DeathbyRomy
| rowspan="4" | Love u - to Death
|"Diamond Tears"
|-
|"Problems"
|-
|"Love U to Death"
|-
|"Sleep at Night"
|-
| rowspan="5" |TXT
| rowspan="2" |The Dream Chapter: Star
|"어느날 머리에서 뿔이 자랐다 (CROWN)"
|-
|"Cat & Dog"
|-
| rowspan="3" |The Dream Chapter: Magic
|"Angel Or Devil"
|-
|"9와 4분의 3 승강장에서 너를 기다려 (Run Away)"
|-
|"Can't We Just Leave the Monster Alive?"
|-
| rowspan="2" |BETWEEN FRIENDS
| rowspan="2" |
|"affection"
|-
|"u can still come over"
|-
| rowspan="2" |Everglow
|Arrival of EVERGLOW
|"Bon Bon Chocolat"
|-
|Hush
|"Hush"
|-
| rowspan="2" |BTS
| rowspan="2" |Map of the Soul: Persona
|"Boy with Luv"
|-
|"Mikrokosmos"
|-
|Twice
|Feel Special
|"Trick It"
|-
|Hyolyn
|
|"니가 더 잘 알잖아(youknowbetter)"
|-
|Jay Ulloa
|
|"Perdóname"
|-
|Brian Justin Crum
|
|"I & U"
|-
|Gavin Haley
|Long Game
|"Show Me"
|-
|Jakob Delgado
|
|"Lie"
|-
|Wengie
|
|"Empire" (featuring Minnie of (G)I-dle)
|-
| rowspan="13" |2020
| rowspan="2" |Little Glee Monster
| rowspan="2" | Bright New World
|"SPIN"
|-
|"move on"
|-
|BTS
|Map of the Soul: 7
|"On" (featuring Sia)
|-
|Dua Lipa
|Future Nostalgia
|"Good In Bed"
|-
|Secret Number
|Who Dis?
|"Who Dis?"
|-
|Hyolyn
|Say My Name
|"Say My Name"
|-
| rowspan="2" |CLC
| rowspan="2" |Helicopter
|"Helicopter"
|-
|"Helicopter - English Version"
|-
|Everglow
|-77.82X-78.29
|"No Good Reason"
|-
| Blackpink
| The Album
| "Bet You Wanna" (featuring Cardi B)
|-
| Twice
| Eyes Wide Open
| "I Can't Stop Me"
|-
| Enhypen
| Border: Day One
| "Given-Taken"
|-
| Twice
| 
|"Cry for Me"
|-
| rowspan="8"|2021
| Dove Cameron
|
| "LazyBaby"
|-
| Enhypen
| Border: Carnival
| "Drunk-Dazed"
|-
| Everglow
| Last Melody
| "Don't Ask Don't Tell"
|-
| TXT
| The Chaos Chapter: Freeze
| "0X1=Lovesong (I Know I Love You)" (featuring Seori)
|-
| Loona
| [&]
| "Dance On My Own"
|-
| Sunmi
| 1/6
| "You Can't Sit With Us"
|-
| rowspan="2"|Twice
| rowspan="2"|Formula of Love: O+T=<3
| Scientist
|-
| Icon
|-
|-
| rowspan="8" |2022
| Tomorrow X Together
| Minisode 2: Thursday's Child
| "Good boy Gone Bad"	
|-
|Seventeen
|Face the Sun| "Don Quixote"	
|-
| BTS
| Proof| "Run BTS"	
|-
| fromis_9
| From Our Memento Box
| "Blind Letter"	
|-
| J-Hope
|Jack in the Box
| "EQUAL SIGN"
|-
| |Seventeen
| Sector 17
| "_World"	
|-
| Hyolyn
| "ice"
| AH YEAH
|-
| rowspan="2" | Twice
| Between 1&2
| "Brave"
|-
| rowspan="2" |2023
| Ready to Be
| "Set Me Free"
|}

As featured artist

Television and voice over
 Vocals for all songs on Nickelodeon's Shimmer and Shine'' animated TV series (2015-2020)

References

External links
 

Living people
1986 births
American women singer-songwriters
People from Newington, Connecticut
Singer-songwriters from New York (state)
21st-century American women singers
21st-century American singers
Singer-songwriters from Connecticut